Karl Hargestam is a Non-Profit Founder, Executive Director, Evangelist, Pilot, Missionary, and Social Entrepreneur who resides in Bakersfield, California. Karl and his wife, Jennifer Hargestam, are best known for founding Joshua Campaign International, Mission One Eleven, and other social enterprises. His most known published works include Mission One Eleven: The Core (2015), Assignment: Path Unveiled (2014), and Journey to the Extreme (2010).

Early Life
Hargestam is from Lycksele in the province of Lapland, Sweden. He lived with his father, mother, and siblings for most of his young adulthood, working for his father's trucking company. Through this young and rapidly growing career, Karl learned how to operationally conduct logistics for the trucking company, which has led to many opportunities to further his ministry.

Major Life Events
One day in Stockholm, Karl and his friends drove recklessly downtown. In a blink of an eye, they found themselves in a terrible car crash where Hargestam had ejected one hundred feet from where the accident occurred. The ambulance and police force rushed to the scene, where they rushed Hargestam to the nearest hospital. The doctor found Hargestam had a fracture to the head and was in a severe coma. The examiners relayed the message that it would be a challenging and slow recovery for Hargestam. 

In this coma, Hargestam has a vision of God, who tells him that he must surrender to God's call on his life. When Karl wakes up from the coma, he is determined to be healed from the fracture and the coma. The doctors examine Hargestam and proclaim that it is a miracle that Hargestamm recovered from all prior injuries. To this day, Hargestam expresses that he had decided to surrender to God, being spared and saved to follow his missional call.  

When Hargestam's parents hear of their son being miraculously healed, Karl's father confesses to him when Karl was born; he was very sick. His father then prayed to God and devoted his son to him. He claims that his devotion to Karl's God as a baby is the reason why Karl was able to grow up into a healthy man. With this information, it was his father's urgency that Karl needed to follow God's will for his life.

Tanzania 
The first step of Karl's ministry set place in Tanzania in 1989, where he began a trucking program where he and a couple of other men would send goods-in-kind from Sweden in shipping containers to different parts of the African country. Hargestam taught the men in Tanzania to drive Land Cruisers, set up tanks, and distribute the goods accordingly. After that, missionaries in places such as Tanzania, Congo, East Africa, and Uganda would receive goods in kind to do compassion ministry with the population they were proclaiming the Gospel.

While this operation was happening in Tanzania, Karl realized that although the program was successful, he did not believe he was reaching his ministry's full potential. He would drive out a hundred miles from the major cities where most of the church was happening and encountered people who had never heard the name of 'Jesus' while many Christian ministries were active in their community. So he concluded his time in Tanzania and decided to take the next step in his church, which included the three M's of his ministry, Mass Evangelism, Mobilization, and Mission Networking.

California
Taking action, Karl's family sold the family trucking business to free Karl from the obligation to stay in Sweden and follow his missional call. Instead, with the money from the family business and overall help from his family, they bought Karl a one-way flight to the United States of America so he could learn how to fly helicopters and pursue his ministry. 

When Karl landed in California in 1991, he was determined to start helicopter schooling. So he decided to go to Concord Helicopter Adventure to begin helicopter schooling, where he would learn English simultaneously.

Ethiopia
As Karl and Jennifer set out on their mission in 1994 to Ethiopia, the scripture of Acts 4:12 remained in their vision, " 12 And in none other is there salvation: for neither is there any other name under heaven, that is given among men, wherein we must be saved. (ASV)." They moved to Arba Minch, a rural African city tasked to start a helicopter base. Their first home was a C-Train Storage Box, where they used tools to cut so they could have windows. 

In this line of work, Karl, a helicopter pilot, would be gone for days flying for Helimission and doing humanitarian work with other pilots and missionaries in Ethiopia. While Karl was out doing this type of work, Jennifer would study the flight maps to figure out where he would be doing ministry. When she was not doing this, she was tending to her first baby daughter and being a social activist in the Arba Minch community. She was involved in the area's human justice issues and social work and served the sizeable human trafficking population. 

In 1997, their second child was born, and they moved to a city named Awassa, where they created another helicopter base. Joshua Campaign International was born during this period and designed to host large Evangelistic Crusades. The ministry included Helimission helicopters that would drop flyers from the sky that would promote the crusade for those to come and hear the Gospel. 

Hargestam was very influential during these massive Evangelistic Crusades. Tens of thousands of people would travel to these Gospel Crusades who would hear the message about Jesus Christ and would accept the Gospel message. People who were a part of Joshua Campaign would bring those possessed to the front of the stadium, and Hargestam would pray and cast out any unpure spirits in them. As a result, people would be miraculously healed and accept the Gospel message of Jesus Christ.

The Shining Man
One day, while Karl was flying in rural Ethiopia with his team, they stopped at a tribe to bring water and goods to a people group. While they passed out their interests to the people, Karl felt the need to share the Gospel. Hargestam asked the King of the tribe if he had ever heard the story about God. The King explained to Karl that he had not listened to the story about God, so Hargestam began to share the shorthand Gospel. The King then interrupts him and asks, "Who is Jesus?" 

Hargestam stops proceeding with the Gospel and asks the man why he asked him about Jesus if he does know God's story. The King then explained three days ago, he had a dream where a 'shining man' came from the sky and told him his people would come from the sky and share the one true God's story. 

Marveled by this, Hargestam completes the shorthand Gospel and asks those there if they would like to receive salvation. The people all accept Christ into their lives, and to this day, people from the tribe have started and planted the indigenous church in their community. When Hargestam caught hold of this issue, it became his and his wife's lifelong mission to reach those who had never had the chance to hear the Gospel before. 

Shortly after, Helimission left their ministry in Ethiopia because of Christian persecution. Being prayerful, Karl and Jennifer decide to go back to the United States of America to disciple people to reach the unreached people groups in the world with the Gospel.

Personal Life
During Karl's young adulthood in the United States, he found a church around the corner from his helicopter school. He became familiar with the church and started to go every Sunday. One morning, a younger woman with blonde hair came to speak about missions at the church where Karl was attending. He introduced himself to her, and they became very fond of each other. They said on the phone weekly while the young woman, Jennifer, was on a mission trip in the Philippines. 

As time passed, Karl and Jennifer were married in Taft, California, where they began fundraising for them to go to the mission field in Ethiopia. The first church that gave to Karl and Jennifer's ministry was named 'New Life' in Bakersfield, California. Their ministry led to Hargestam learning about a ministry called Helimission which went to different tribes in nations to do ministry using helicopters. The Hargestams completed their fundraising and moved to Ethiopia, only having $1,000 monthly to advance their ministry and feed their family, with Jennifer expecting their firstborn daughter. They together have four children. Two sons and daughters: Hannah, Jacob, Abigail, and Luke.

While in Ethiopia, Karl's wife, Jennifer, was heavily active in the population of those human trafficked. Every day she would walk the streets of the city and try to minister to the girls in a traumatic state. One day while Jennifer was walking, she noticed a box on the road that contained a dying African baby girl. She decided to care for the baby girl by taking her to the hospital. After the doctor examined the baby, he told Jennifer the baby would die. The doctor diagnosed the baby with HIV, HEP A, and many bacterial sores that were causing damage to her development. In utter disbelief, Jennifer decided to take the baby back to her home and let her die peacefully. The night Karl arrives home from a day in the tribes, Jennifer shares the story of the dying baby girl in their living room. As Karl looks at the dying baby girl, he prays to God aloud, "God, if you heal this baby, I will raise this baby as my own." Praying feverously, Jennifer took the baby back to the hospital and asked the doctor to do a check-up. When the doctor rechecked her, he was astounded by what they found. The prayers to God healed the baby girl from HIV and HEP A. There were no signs in her body that she had ever had any problems with those diseases. It was a miracle. Karl and Jennifer decided to adopt and named the little girl Abigail. As time passed, Abigail healed, and Jennifer became pregnant again with her second boy, having four children.

Career
Karl Hargestam left his native Sweden with the mandate to reach the unreached people in Africa with the Gospel.
During his early mission work in Africa, Karl, together with his family and staff, became the reason for great change among African tribes that never had heard of Jesus. A vision, "One Chance for Every Person" was born from the conviction that it should be a provided access to hear the gospel at least once. Karl and his wife Jennifer are founders of Joshua Campaign International, Mission One Eleven and several other organizations.

One Chance for Every Person 
Throughout Hargestam's time in Ethiopia, he and his family witnessed unique and wonderful redemption from many people. Unfortunately, the mission group Hargestam was associated with was thrown out of Ethiopia. As Hargestam and his family prepared for God to make a new path, he advanced and created a new career path. Hargestam and his family moved to Fraizer Park, California, and launched their first missionary training school, 'Mission One Eleven. ' This mission training school was created by Karl and Jennifer, inspired to lead and mobilize teams of young people to reach those with the Gospel who have never heard.

Works
Paperback
The Assignment Workbook (2010)
The Assignment: Journey To The Extreme (2010)
Mission One Eleven: The Core (2015)

Kindle Edition
The Assignment: Journey To The Extreme VOL 1
The Assignment: Path Unveiled (Vol. 2)

References

External links

Karl Hargestam on Goodreads

Joshua Campaign
One Chance For Every Person
CityServe Network
CityServe 

21st-century Swedish writers
Swedish male writers
Religious writers
Swedish non-fiction writers
Living people
Year of birth missing (living people)
Male non-fiction writers